Cornwall is an unincorporated community in eastern Madison County, in the U.S. state of Missouri.

The community is on Missouri Route F above Henderson Creek. Henderson is approximately five miles to the northwest and Marquand is six miles to the southeast.

History
Cornwall was platted in 1889 when the railroad was extended to that point. A post office called Cornwall was established in 1870, and remained in operation until 1955.

References

Unincorporated communities in Madison County, Missouri
Unincorporated communities in Missouri